Villa Rosario de Wilacala is a village in the La Paz Department in Bolivia. It is the seat of the Villa Rosario de Wila Khala Canton, one of the five cantons of the Mocomoco Municipality which is the second municipal section of the Eliodoro Camacho Province. The village is situated 4,264 m high at the north-western edge of the Muñecas Mountain Range (Cordillera Muñecas) near the border to Peru. At the time of census 2001 it had a population of 303.

The people in the Mocomoco Municipality are mainly Aymara (93.84%) and most citizens speak Aymara (92.68%) followed by Spanish (5.69%) and Quechua (1.25%) .

References

External links 
 Mocomoco Municipality: population data and map (pdf)

Populated places in La Paz Department (Bolivia)